Tamagne Beyene (Amharic: ታማኝ በየነ) is an Ethiopian human rights activist, former actor, comedian and media personality. Born in Gondar, Tamagne was recruited to the Gondar Traditional Group in 1981. He soon joined the Ethiopian National Theatre in 1983, performing as comedian, actor, singer, drummer and saxophonist.

During the Tigray People's Liberation Front regime, Tamagne exiled to the United States in 1996 and worked as activist against the authoritarian government. Tamagne finally returned to Ethiopia by the call of Prime Minister Abiy Ahmed in September 2018.

Life and career
Tamagne Beyene was born Chilga, a small town in Gondar. At his young age, he established a Children's Musical Group, and was later recruited to the Gondar Traditional Group in 1981. As his enthusiasm at arts and theatre influenced gradually, he was recruited by the National Theatre in 1983. Since then, he served in the National Theatre in various aspects. Tamagne played a mult-facet professions in the theater: comedian, singer, drummer and saxophonist.

Since the Tigray People's Liberation Front (TPLF) came to power in 1991, he was living in exile in Washington D.C. in 1996. He opposed the authoritarian TPLF regime and its ethnocentric policies and he was under political persecution, which made him a political activist. Under Abiy Ahmed power in April 2018, he called the opposition groups of the former ruling party, the Ethiopian People's Revolutionary Democratic Front (EPRDF), including Tamagne, to return in Ethiopia. On 1 September 2018, he returned to Addis Ababa after spending in exile in the United States. He was welcomed by government officials of Ministry of Industry Ambachew Mekonnen and Mayor of Addis Ababa Takele Uma Banti.

References

Ethiopian activists
Ethiopian human rights activists
20th-century Ethiopian actors
20th-century Ethiopian male actors
Ethiopian comedians
People from Gondar
Year of birth missing (living people)
Living people
People from Chilga